Dequan Townsend (born May 11, 1986) is an American mixed martial artist currently competing in the Light Heavyweight division. He has previously fought for the Ultimate Fighting Championship (UFC).

Background
Townsend originally began training cardio kickboxing along with powerlifting before transitioning to mixed martial arts in 2009.

Mixed martial arts career

Early career
After an 8–4 amateur career, Townsend compiled a professional mixed martial arts record of 21–8. Townsend later signed with the UFC in June 2019.

Ultimate Fighting Championship
Townsend made his UFC debut at light heavyweight on June 29, 2019 as a late-notice opponent against Dalcha Lungiambula at UFC on ESPN: Ngannou vs. dos Santos. He lost the fight via TKO with punches and elbows in round three.

Townsend tested positive for benzoylecgonine, a metabolite of cocaine, and norfentanyl, a metabolite of fentanyl and its derivatives, as the result of an in-competition urine sample he provided on June 28, 2019 at UFC Fight Night Minneapolis. He was suspended 6 months by USADA.

Townsend moved to middleweight and faced Bevon Lewis on January 25, 2020 at UFC Fight Night: Blaydes vs. dos Santos. He lost the fight via unanimous decision.

Townsend returned to light heavyweight and faced Devin Clark on February 15, 2020 at UFC Fight Night: Anderson vs. Błachowicz 2. He lost the fight via unanimous decision.

Townsend faced Duško Todorović on October 4, 2020 at UFC on ESPN: Holm vs. Aldana. He lost the fight via technical knockout in round two.

On October 7, 2020 it was reported Townsend was released by UFC.

Post UFC 
In his first bout since his release from the UFC, Townsend faced Portland Pringle III for the TWC Middleweight Championship at Total Warrior Combat: Unfinished Business on February 5, 2022. He won the bout and title via unanimous decision.

Townsend faced Jason Butcher on April 2, 2022 at B2 Fighting Series 154 for the B2FS Light Heavyweight Championship. He won the bout and title via unanimous decision.

Townsend faced Daniel Spohn on October 8, 2022 at Ohio Combat League 22. He lost the bout via unanimous decision.

Personal life
Townsend had four sons of whom one – Malakye – died of cancer in March 2015. Townsend is also a registered nurse, working in home health care area full-time.

Townsend had two brothers, Steven and Marcus, who both were killed in a strip mall shooting in Lansing, Michigan in August 2020.

Championships and accomplishments

Warrior Xtreme Cagefighting
WXC Middleweight Championship (Two-time)
WXC Welterweight Championship (One time)

Total Warrior Combat
TWC Light Heavyweight Championship (One time)
TWC Middleweight Championship (Two time)
TWC Welterweight Championship (Two time)
Two successful title defenses
B2 Fighting Series
B2FS Light Heavyweight Championship (One time)

Mixed martial arts record

|-
|Loss
|align=center|23–13
|Dan Spohn
|Decision (unanimous)
|Ohio Combat League 22
|
|align=center|3
|align=center|5:00
|Columbus, Ohio, United States
|
|-
|Win
|align=center|23–12
|Jason Butcher
|Decision (unanimous)
|B2 Fighting Series 154
|
|align=center|5
|align=center|5:00
|Novi, Michigan, United States
|
|-
|Win
|align=center|22–12
|Portland Pringle III
|Decision (unanimous)
|Total Warrior Combat: Unfinished Business
|
|align=center|3
|align=center|5:00
|Lansing, Michigan, United States
|
|-
|Loss
|align=center|21–12
|Duško Todorović
|TKO (punches)
|UFC on ESPN: Holm vs. Aldana
|
|align=center|2
|align=center|3:15
|Abu Dhabi, United Arab Emirates
|
|-
|Loss
|align=center|21–11
|Devin Clark
|Decision (unanimous)
|UFC Fight Night: Anderson vs. Błachowicz 2
|
|align=center|3
|align=center|5:00
|Rio Rancho, New Mexico, United States
|
|-
|Loss
|align=center|21–10
|Bevon Lewis
|Decision (unanimous)
|UFC Fight Night: Blaydes vs. dos Santos
|
|align=center|3
|align=center|5:00
|Raleigh, North Carolina, United States
|
|-
|Loss
|align=center|21–9
|Dalcha Lungiambula
|TKO (punches and elbows)
|UFC on ESPN: Ngannou vs. dos Santos
|
|align=center|3
|align=center|0:42
|Minneapolis, Minnesota, United States
|
|-
|Win
|align=center|21–8
|Wayman Carter
|Submission (guillotine choke)
|TWC: Brooks vs. Robinson
|
|align=center|1
|align=center|1:31
|Lansing, Michigan, United States
|
|-
|Win
|align=center|20–8
|Portland Pringle III
|Decision (split)
|TWC: Bennett vs. Shaw
|
|align=center|3
|align=center|5:00
|Lansing, Michigan, United States
|
|-
|Loss
|align=center|19–8
|Jamahal Hill
|Decision (unanimous)
|KOP 62: KnockOut Promotions 62
|
|align=center|5
|align=center|5:00
|Grand Rapids, Michigan, United States
|
|-
|Win
|align=center|19–7
|Muhammad Abdullah
|Submission (guillotine choke)
|WXC 71: Night of Champions 10
|
|align=center|3
|align=center|3:58
|Southgate, Michigan, United States
|
|-
|Win
|align=center|18–7
|Héctor Urbina
|KO (head kick)
|New League Fights 7: Hallows Eve
|
|align=center|1
|align=center|1:16
|Montpelier, Ohio, United States
|
|-
|Win
|align=center|17–7
|Willis Black
|TKO (head kick and punches)
|WXC 69: Illuminate
|
|align=center|1
|align=center|0:28
|Southgate, Michigan, United States
|
|-
|Win
|align=center|16–7
|Timothy Woods
|Decision (unanimous)
|FSF MMA: New Beginning
|
|align=center|3
|align=center|5:00
|Birch Run, Michigan, United States
|
|-
|Loss
|align=center|15–7
|Luka Strezoski
|Submission (heel hook)
|RFO: Big Guns 23: Battle for the Belts
|
|align=center|1
|align=center|1:42
|Cleveland, Ohio, United States
|
|-
|Loss
|align=center|15–6
|Jason Fischer
|Decision (unanimous)
|WXC 66: Night of Champions 9
|
|align=center|5
|align=center|5:00
|Southgate, Michigan, United States
|
|-
|Win
|align=center|15–5
|Ted Worthington
|TKO (punches)
|TWC Pro Series: Anderson vs. Veerella
|
|align=center|1
|align=center|1:24
|Lansing, Michigan, United States
|
|-
|Loss
|align=center|14–5
|Dakota Cochrane
|Decision (split)
|TWC 29: Jaynes vs. Lamson
|
|align=center|5
|align=center|5:00
|Lansing, Michigan, United States
|
|-
|Loss
|align=center|14–4
|Kevin Nowaczyk
|Decision (unanimous)
|HFC 27: Hoosier Fight Club 27
|
|align=center|5
|align=center|5:00
|Michigan City, Indiana, United States
|
|-
|Win
|align=center|14–3
|Erick Lozano
|Submission (triangle choke)
|TWC 28: Townsend vs. Lozano
|
|align=center|2
|align=center|2:51
|Lansing, Michigan, United States
|
|-
|Win
|align=center|13–3
|Dustin Pape
|Submission (triangle choke)
|DC 9: Duneland Classic 9
|
|align=center|2
|align=center|4:22
|Laporte, Indiana, United States
|
|-
|Win
|align=center|12–3
|Tenyeh Dixon
|TKO (punches)
|WXC 59: Homeland Pride
|
|align=center|3
|align=center|0:18
|Taylor, Michigan, United States
|
|-
|Win
|align=center|11–3
|Deray Davis
|Decision (unanimous)
|MFL 38: Michiana Fight League 38
|
|align=center|3
|align=center|5:00
|South Bend, Indiana, United States
|
|-
|Win
|align=center|10–3
|Josh Taveirne
|TKO (doctor stoppage)
|TWC 27: Townsend vs. Taveirne
|
|align=center|3
|align=center|3:40
|Lansing, Michigan, United States
|
|-
|Win
|align=center|9–3
|Dom O'Grady
|TKO (punches)
|WXC 55: Fully Loaded
|
|align=center|1
|align=center|4:58
|Southgate, Michigan, United States
|
|-
|Win
|align=center|8–3
|Billy Ward
|TKO (punches)
|TWC 26: Townsend vs. Ward
|
|align=center|1
|align=center|2:19
|Lansing, Michigan, United States
|
|-
|Loss
|align=center|7–3
|David Evans
|Decision (unanimous)
|WXC 52: Evolution
|
|align=center|5
|align=center|5:00
|Southgate, Michigan, United States
|
|-
|Win
|align=center|7–2
|Darryl Madison
|Submission (rear-naked choke)
|MFL: Michiana Fight League 34
|
|align=center|2
|align=center|2:30
|South Bend, Indiana, United States
|
|-
|Win
|align=center|6–2
|Marcus Reynolds
|KO (kick to body)
|XFC 27: Frozen Fury
|
|align=center|3
|align=center|2:52
|Muskegon, Michigan, United States
|
|-
|Win
|align=center|5–2
|Erick Lozano
|KO
|TWC 20: Final Cut
|
|align=center|1
|align=center|2:33
|Lansing, Michigan, United States
|
|-
|Loss
|align=center|4–2
|Rocky Johnson
|Decision (unanimous)
|SCL: Havoc at the Hellespont
|
|align=center|3
|align=center|5:00
|Loveland, Colorado, United States
|
|-
|Win
|align=center|4–1
|Anthony Smith
|TKO (punches)
|TWC 18: Bulletproof
|
|align=center|1
|align=center|3:28
|Lansing, Michigan, United States
|
|-
|Win
|align=center|3–1
|Canaan Grigsby
|KO (punches)
|SCL: Thunderdome
|
|align=center|1
|align=center|0:07
|Denver, Colorado, United States
|
|-
|Win
|align=center|2–1
|Robby Longwith
|TKO (punches)
|TWC 14: Up Close and Personal
|
|align=center|1
|align=center|0:27
|Lansing, Michigan, United States
|
|-
|Loss
|align=center|1–1
|Jason Cardillo
|Decision (unanimous)
|NAAFS: Caged Fury 17
|
|align=center|3
|align=center|5:00
|Morgantown, West Virginia, United States
|
|-
|Win
|align=center|1–0
|Andy Hahn
|Decision (split)
|IFL 45: My Bloody Valentine
|
|align=center|3
|align=center|5:00
|Auburn Hills, Michigan, United States
|
|-

See also 
 List of male mixed martial artists

References

External links 

 
 

1986 births
Living people
Light heavyweight mixed martial artists
Sportspeople from Lansing, Michigan
Mixed martial artists from Michigan
American male mixed martial artists
Ultimate Fighting Championship male fighters